Columnea microphylla is a species of Gesneriaceae that is native to Costa Rica.

References

External links
 
 

microphylla
Plants described in 1858
Flora of Costa Rica